Beef is a 2003 American documentary film directed by Peter Spirer about the history of hip-hop feuds. Produced by Peter Spirer, Casey Suchan and Denis Henry Hennelly and executive produced by Quincy Jones III (QD3), the film was written by Peter Alton and Spirer, and narrated by actor Ving Rhames.

Content
Beef takes a chronological look at battles (some friendly, but many personal) dating back to rap music's infancy in the early 1980s. The notable rivalries discussed include KRS-One vs. MC Shan, Kool Moe Dee vs. Busy Bee, 50 Cent vs. Murder Inc Records, Tru Life vs. Mobb Deep, Common vs. Ice Cube & Westside Connection, the break-up of legendary group N.W.A, which includes Ice Cube's abrupt departure, and the later animosity between Dr. Dre and Eazy-E, the highly publicized Jay-Z vs. Nas rivalry and the most infamous feud of all, 2Pac vs. The Notorious B.I.G. It was partly born out of producer Jones's belief that "Beefs are killing hip-hop".

Many prominent hip-hop personalities such as Russell Simmons, Snoop Dogg, Kool Moe Dee, Jay-Z, KRS-One, Mack 10, DMX and Ice-T also participate through interviews (some produced for the film, as well as archived interviews from other sources, such as MTV and BET clips). Beef also features newly released performances by many musical artists.

The film also contains never-before-seen performances by many of the participants and many others, plus extended portions of interviews that did not make final cut. One portion of the extended interviews features part of an interview with Nate Dogg talking about an incident that occurred around 1995 at a Dogg Pound video shoot, in which entourage members representing Ruthless Records showed up and started a big brawl with members of then-rival Death Row Records. Although he did not mention them by name (he however subtlety mentioned the duo's less-than-successful 1995 album Real Brothaz), rappers B.G. Knocc Out and Dresta (who participated in Eazy-E's hit diss recording, Real Muthaphuckkin G's) were among the alleged participants in the fight.

Critical reaction
The Los Angeles Times called it "engrossing" and "a moving lament for the way hip-hop once was".

Complex rated it number 10 in its 25 best hiphop documentaries, calling it a "classic hip hop doc".

Soundtrack

"No Vaseline" by Ice Cube
"Beef" by Tech N9ne featuring Krizz Kaliko
"You Don't Really Want It" by KRS-One
"Westside Slaughterhouse" by Westside Connection
"Murder by #'s" by Skatterman & Snug Brim featuring Ricky Scarfo
"Drama" by Prodigy featuring Twin
"Real Muthaphuckkin G's" by Eazy-E featuring B.G. Knocc Out and Dresta
"Caution" by Black Child
"When The Rain Drops" by Kutt Calhoun featuring Snug Brim
"That's It" by KRS-One featuring Mad Lion
"Postman" by Poverty
"Now I See" by MC Shan
"Snake Ya" by Tech N9ne featuring Krizz Kaliko
"Let's Go (It's A Movement)" by Warren G featuring KRS-One and Lil' AI
"Witness Protection" by Jayo Felony
"Day I Die" by Tru-Life
"Fuck Tha Police" by N.W.A

Legacy
Subsequent releases in this series include Beef II (2004, also produced by Suchan and Hennelly, and narrated by actor Keith David), Beef 3 (2005, narrated by DJ Kay Slay) and a BET series titled Beef: The Series, which premiered in 2006. These sequels are a continuation of the original film, but cover lesser-known confrontations and developing beefs just prior to the release of each respective installment. They include LL Cool J vs. Canibus, Ja Rule vs. DMX, 50 Cent vs. The Game, Lil' Flip vs. T.I., Nelly vs. Chingy, and Erick Sermon vs. EPMD partner Parrish Smith. In 2011, Spirer speculated on the possibility of a fourth film, suggesting he was a little tired of the "he said/she said" drama but he might produce further specials in future.

See also
Beef II
Beef: The Series

References

External links

2003 films
American documentary films
Documentary films about hip hop music and musicians
Hip hop feuds
2003 documentary films
2000s English-language films
2000s American films